Auburn is an unincorporated community located in Lincoln County, Mississippi, United States.

In 1900, Auburn was home to a high school and masonic lodge and had a population of 57.

A post office operated under the name Auburn from 1890 to 1953.

Notable person
 Edgar Godbold, president of Louisiana College from 1942 to 1951

References

Unincorporated communities in Lincoln County, Mississippi
Unincorporated communities in Mississippi